Euphorbia ceratocarpa is a species of flowering plant in the spurge family Euphorbiaceae, native to the Island of Sicily and southern Italy.
and clusters of green and yellow flowers in summer. The flowering period may be extended in favourable locations. It is valued in cultivation for its vivid flowers, and its ability to survive drought conditions. Though hardy down to  it is seen at its best in a warm, sheltered position. It has gained the Royal Horticultural Society’s Award of Garden Merit.

Like other members of the genus Euphorbia, all parts of the plant are toxic if ingested. When cut it produces a milky sap which may cause intense irritation to hands and eyes.

References

Flora of Sicily
ceratocarpa